Fuck You!!! and Loving It: A Retrospective is the first and only greatest hits album released under Wendy O. Williams' name. While credited as a Wendy O. Williams album, it also includes songs from her career with the Plasmatics, excepting only Coup d'Etat.

In 2003, the album was re-released by indie label Powerage.

Track listing
"Tight Black Pants" Live (with a special rehearsal segment from 1977) (from New Hope for the Wretched)
"Butcher Baby" (from New Hope for the Wretched)
"Sex Junkie" Live (from Beyond the Valley of 1984)
"A Pig is a Pig" (from Beyond the Valley of 1984)
"It's My Life" (from WOW and the Reform School Girls soundtrack)
"Hoy Hey (Live to Rock)" (from Kommander of Kaos)
"Goin' Wild" (from Kommander of Kaos)
"You're a Zombie" (from Maggots: The Record)
"Propagators" (from Maggots: The Record)
"Know W'am Sayn'" (from Deffest! and Baddest!)

References

Plasmatics albums
Wendy O. Williams albums
1988 compilation albums